Maillen is a village of Wallonia and district of the municipality of Assesse, located in the province of Namur, Belgium. 

Many Ancient Roman sites could be found in this town, including one at the site of the Ronchinne Castle built by Prince Victor Napoléon.

References

External links

 Assesse municipal website 

Former municipalities of Namur (province)